Stanley Festus Sofu (born 1964 in Fataolo Village, Malaita Province) is a Solomon Islands politician.

He attended the Honiara Technical Institute from 1981 to 1985, followed by management courses, before working as a heavy plant mechanic. He then obtained a position as a works officer, and eventually as principal works officer, before going into politics. He began his political career as a member of the Provincial Assembly of Malaita Province, becoming Deputy Premier and Education Minister for the Province, before moving on to national politics.

His career in national politics began when he was elected to Parliament as the member for East Kwaio in the April 2006 general election. When Snyder Rini's government was forced to resign in the face of public protests and a motion of no confidence in May, the new Prime Minister, Manasseh Sogavare, appointed Sofu to Cabinet as Minister for Infrastructure and Development. In November 2007, Sofu joined the Opposition and left the Cabinet, but regained a Cabinet position when Sogavare's government was ousted by a motion of no confidence in December. Sogavare's successor, Derek Sikua, returned Sofu to his post as Minister for Infrastructure and Development, which he then held until August 2010.

He retained his seat in Parliament in the August 2010 general election. As a member of the Democratic Party, led by Opposition Leader Steve Abana, he served initially as an Opposition frontbencher; Abana appointed him Shadow Minister for Infrastructure Development. In December, however, in a Cabinet reshuffle prompted by the sacking of two ministers, Sofu defected to the government and was promoted to Cabinet as Minister for Public Service. The following month, he defected back to the Opposition, two days after four other ministers had moved to the Opposition. On February 20, he defected to the government once more, following four other MPs who had moved from the Opposition to the government in the preceding days. He was restored to his position as Minister for Public Service.

On April 18, Philip removed him from Cabinet in a reshuffle to make way for five Opposition members who had just joined the government ranks. Sofu was succeeded by Ricky Houeniopwela, who like him was formally aligned with the Democratic Party.

When Gordon Darcy Lilo became Prime Minister in November 2011, Sofu sat on the government backbenches. On 22 October 2012, he was promoted to the position of Minister for Public Service, as part of a Cabinet reshuffle.

References

1964 births
Living people
Members of the National Parliament of the Solomon Islands
People from Malaita Province
Government ministers of the Solomon Islands
Solomon Islands Democratic Party politicians